Jess Nevins (born 1966) is an American author. Nevins is the author of the Encyclopedia of Fantastic Victoriana and other works on Victoriana and pulp fiction. He is employed as a reference librarian at Lone Star College-Tomball.

Comic book annotations

Early work
Nevins has annotated several comics, starting with a number of Elseworlds published by DC Comics, including Kingdom Come and JLA: The Nail.

The League of Extraordinary Gentlemen
Nevins also annotated many of Alan Moore's for his America's Best Comics imprint, starting with The League of Extraordinary Gentlemen. Moore said of Nevins' work, "It was only when someone finally conveyed these internet postings to me... that I began to understand the invaluable asset that Jess represented... I realised that if we had [him] tracking down all of the references for the readers, then we could be as obscure and far-reaching as we wanted...", Moore later said Nevins' work helped inform The League of Extraordinary Gentlemen, Volume II: "The New Traveller's Almanac": "The patient work contained within this current volume [Heroes & Monsters] has played an important part in the construction of this vast, imaginary global edifice that we're constructing... [the Almanac]", Moore sees "these companion volumes as having a necessary organic place in the body of the work itself."

Other annotations
In-between volumes of LoEG, Nevins has tackled Moore and Gene Ha's Top Ten. He subsequently provided annotations on Moore and Ha's 2005 Top Ten graphic novel The Forty-Niners and Paul Di Filippo and Jerry Ordway's 2005 sequel miniseries Beyond the Farthest Precinct. Nevins also began to annotate Neil Gaiman and Andy Kubert's 2003 mini-series 1602 from Marvel Comics.

Other work
On his website, Nevins has compiled the reference guide The Golden Age Heroes Directory, the Pulp and Adventure Heroes Directory, and Fantastic, Mysterious, and Adventurous Victoriana.

He has also written stories appearing in the Tales of the Shadowmen anthology series: "A Jest, To Pass The Time" from volume 2, "Red in Tooth and Claw" in volume 4, and "A Root That Beareth Gall and Worms" in volume 5.

Nevins has much expanded some of his online resources for print, authoring The Encyclopedia of Fantastic Victoriana, the definitive guide on the strange and wonderful of that period. In May 2007, McFarland & Company published his Pulp Holdings Index, a listing of which issues of which pulp magazines are held in which American, Canadian, British, and European libraries.

Nevins has also been published in Steve Jackson Games' Pyramid, at the comics website Comic Book Resources.

He also adapted his "Pulp Heroes" resource into the Encyclopedia of Pulp Heroes (2017) as well as his companion superhero reference work, the Encyclopedia of Golden Age Superheroes.

His book Horror Fiction in the 20th Century (2020) won a Reference and User Services Association award from the American Library Association as one of the 10 most outstanding reference works of the year.

Bibliography
 Heroes & Monsters: The Unofficial Companion to the League of Extraordinary Gentlemen (paperback, 239 pages, MonkeyBrain, 2003, Titan Books, 2006)
 A Blazing World: The Unofficial Companion to the Second League of Extraordinary Gentlemen (paperback, 240 pages, MonkeyBrain, 2004, Titan Books, 2006)
 Encyclopedia of Fantastic Victoriana (hardcover, 1200 pages, MonkeyBrain, 2005)
 Pulp Magazine Holdings Directory: Library Collections in North America and Europe (McFarland & Company, May 2007)
 "Introduction" to Nick Carter vs. Fantômas by Alexandre Bisson & Guillaume Livet (adaptation by Frank Morlock) (Black Coat Press, 2007) 
 "Introduction" to Paper Cities: An Anthology of Urban Fantasy by Ekaterina Sedia (ed.) (Senses Five Press, 2008) 
 Impossible Territories: An Unofficial Companion to the League of Extraordinary Gentlemen The Black Dossier (paperback, 304 pages, MonkeyBrain, July 2008)
 Encyclopedia of Pulp Heroes (self-published ebook, 2017)
 Encyclopedia of Golden Age Superheroes (High Rock Press, 2nd ed. 2017)
 Horror Fiction in the 20th Century: Exploring Literature's Most Chilling Genre (Praeger Publishing, January 7, 2020)

References

External links
 
 

1966 births
American librarians
American male writers
Living people
People from Winchester, Massachusetts
Pulp fiction researchers
Usenet people